Friesodielsia is a genus of flowering plants in the custard apple and soursop family Annonaceae, with all species found in the Old World, mostly in the tropics. A molecular study shows that Friesodielsia should be more narrowly circumscribed, with the only species remaining being the Asian ones, which can also be distinguished by their possession of globose or ellipsoid monocarps, and six petals per flower arranged in two whorls.

Species
, Plants of the World Online accepted the following species:

Friesodielsia affinis (Hook.f. & Thomson) D.Das
Friesodielsia alpina (J.Sinclair) Steenis
Friesodielsia auriculata (Elmer) Steenis
Friesodielsia bakeri (Merr.) Steenis
Friesodielsia biglandulosa (Blume) Steenis
Friesodielsia borneensis (Miq.) Steenis
Friesodielsia caesia (Miq.) Steenis
Friesodielsia calycina (King) Steenis
Friesodielsia cuneiformis (Blume) Steenis
Friesodielsia desmoides (Craib) Steenis
Friesodielsia discolor (Craib) D.Das
Friesodielsia excisa (Miq.) Steenis
Friesodielsia filipes (Hook.f. & Thomson) Steenis
Friesodielsia formosa I.M.Turner
Friesodielsia fornicata (Roxb.) D.Das
Friesodielsia glauca (Hook.f. & Thomson) Steenis
Friesodielsia grandifolia (Merr.) I.M.Turner
Friesodielsia hainanensis Y.Tsiang & P.T.Li
Friesodielsia hirta (Miq.) Steenis
Friesodielsia khoshooi Vasudeva Rao & Chakrab.
Friesodielsia kingii (J.Sinclair) Steenis
Friesodielsia korthalsiana (Miq.) Steenis
Friesodielsia lagunensis (Elmer) Steenis
Friesodielsia lanceolata (Merr.) Steenis
Friesodielsia latifolia (Hook.f. & Thomson) Steenis
Friesodielsia longiflora (Merr.) Steenis
Friesodielsia maclellandii (Hook.f. & Thomson) D.Das
Friesodielsia mindorensis (Merr.) Steenis
Friesodielsia obtusifolia (Elmer) Steenis
Friesodielsia oligophlebia (Merr.) Steenis
Friesodielsia ovalifolia (Ridl.) I.M.Turner
Friesodielsia paucinervis (Merr.) Steenis
Friesodielsia philippinensis (Merr.) Steenis
Friesodielsia platyphylla (Merr.) Steenis
Friesodielsia pubescens (Merr.) Steenis
Friesodielsia sahyadrica N.V.Page & Survesw.
Friesodielsia stenopetala (Hook.f. & Thomson) D.Das
Friesodielsia subaequalis (Scheff.) R.M.K.Saunders, X.Guo & C.C.Tang
Friesodielsia unonifolia (A.DC.) Steenis

Notes

References

Annonaceae genera
Annonaceae